Wheely Ltd., commonly known as Wheely, is a Swiss-founded British vehicle for hire company based in London that allows users to book chauffeur-driven journeys in a luxury vehicle either on-demand or in advance. Its services are accessed through its mobile apps on the Android and iOS operating systems, and are available in London, Paris, Moscow, and St. Petersburg. In 2021, Wheely announced plans to expand into Dubai.

Wheely was founded by Anton Chirkunov in 2010. As of early 2020, Wheely had 110 million annually in bookings and a total passenger base of 80,000 customers. In 2014, Wired listed Wheely as one of the "hottest" European startups; In 2019, The Financial Times included Wheely in a list of the 1,000 fastest-growing companies in Europe.

History 
Swiss-Russian founder Anton Chirkunov launched Wheely in Zurich in 2010, seeking to create a data aggregation app similar to Booking.com but for taxis instead of hotels. Lacking a driver's license and frustrated by his taxi experiences, he eventually switched focus to develop a premium ride-hailing platform that connects riders with accredited chauffeurs. The company debuted a prototype taxi aggregator service in London in 2012. Chirkunov signed contracts with private hire companies to provide drivers and Toyota Prius vehicles. However, Wheely struggled to compete with other private hire taxi and courier companies. As a result, when the service launched in Russia in 2012, Chirkunov decided to focus on the luxury market. Service then expanded to Saint Petersburg in 2013. Following their success in Russia, Wheely relaunched as a luxury vehicle for hire service in London in 2018, starting with a soft launch in February. By April, Wheely had 150 professional chauffeurs driving E-Class and S-Class Mercedes-Benz vehicles in London. The transition proved successful, and by mid 2018 there were approximately 2,500 chauffeurs on the Wheely platform across all markets. The company's headquarters were relocated from Moscow to London in 2019, ahead of Brexit and a planned expansion in Europe. Wheely launched in Paris in September 2019, coinciding with Paris Fashion Week. Seeking to expand into the Middle East, Wheely applied for an e-hailing license in Dubai in 2021.

Business model
The company's business model focuses on the luxury vehicle for hire market. Wheely markets its services to wealthier riders looking for a more personalized, premium service. It has a time and distance pricing model for journeys and does not use "surge pricing". Drivers are "third-party partners" of Wheely, not employees; the company contracts with individual professional chauffeurs. All chauffeurs are required to successfully graduate from Wheely's three-day Academy, which covers service standards, etiquette, discretion, and first aid. Wheely requires chauffeurs to use specific luxury vehicles that are no more than three years old. The company earns 20 percent from each ride.

Services 
Wheely's mobile app is available for the iOS and Android operating systems. To use the service, an individual must download the app, create a user profile and enter their credit card details. Users can book rides in advance or on-demand by using the app to enter starting location and destination.

The company has three service classes which use Mercedes-Benz's E-Class, S-Class, and V-Class models, respectively; additionally, Maybach models are used in Russia, as of 2019. There are minimum fees for each class, and final service fees are dependent on distance and time; fixed rates are available for transfers to and from major airports such as Heathrow and Gatwick.

Corporate affairs 
As of 2018, Chirkunov owned 59.6% of the shares in Wheely. Wheely is based in London and has between 3,000 and 3,500 chauffeurs as of April 2019. The company reached 110 million in annualized gross bookings by February 2020. Wheely has approximately 200 employees.

Investments 
Chirkunov initially invested 2.5 million in the company, most of which came from friends and family. Wheely won a 25,000 grant from Start Fellows initiative, which was established by Pavel Durov and Yuri Milner. Total investments in Wheely grew to 13 million in 2018. The company raised 15 million in a Series B round led by the venture capital firm Concentric in 2019. Wheely had raised 28 million from investors, as of 2020.

Privacy 
Due to its pro-data privacy stance, Wheely has in the past refused to hand over requests for passenger or journey data to governments. In 2020, the Moscow Department of Transportation demanded that Wheely begins sharing real-time journey data from all the vehicles on its platform. Wheely filed an official complaint with the UK's Information Commissioner's Office, as fulfilling the request would have violated Wheely's General Data Protection Regulation (GDPR) obligations.

Wheely was the only ride-hail company to not provide this data about customers in Russia, which led to a three-month suspension of their Russian subsidiary. Wheely's website offers a page "debunking" official arguments for why the data should have been handed over.

References

External links
 

Transport companies established in 2010
Companies based in London
Location-based software
Transport in London
Transport in Moscow
Transport in Paris
Transport in Saint Petersburg